Endographis is a genus of moths of the family Crambidae. It contains only one species, Endographis acrochlora, which is found on Borneo.

References

Pyraustinae
Taxa named by Edward Meyrick
Monotypic moth genera
Moths of Asia
Crambidae genera